Adson Alves da Silva or simply Tinho (born 24 November 1982 in Juazeiro), is a Brazilian striker. He currently plays for Oulu.

He was loaned to Gondomar at Liga de Honra 2007-08 season.

Honours
Pernambuco State League: 2004, 2007

References

External links 

meusport

1982 births
Living people
Brazilian footballers
Brazilian expatriate footballers
Juazeiro Social Clube players
Clube Náutico Capibaribe players
União Agrícola Barbarense Futebol Clube players
Sport Club do Recife players
Expatriate footballers in Portugal
Expatriate footballers in Finland
Association football forwards